Il pistolero segnato da Dio is an Italian Spaghetti Western film directed by Giorgio Ferroni  and starring Anthony Steffen.

Plot

Cast 
 Anthony Steffen as Roy Kerry
 Richard Wyler as  Coleman
 Ken Wood as  Owl Roy
  Liz Barret as  Maggie
 Andrea Bosic as  Jonathan Murphy
 Tom Felleghy as Bludy
 Gia Sandri as Dora
 Ennio Balbo as Thomas Claridge
 Rina Franchetti as Miss Claridge
 Nello Pazzafini 
 Benito Stefanelli

Production
Il pistolero segnato da dio directed the film under his name he used for Westerns Calvin Jackson Padget. It was filmed at Elios Studios and on location in Rome. Richard Stapley spoke about the film stating he was introduced to the film by his agents who told him Ferroni was a "first-class director" and that Stapley would "have a great time working with him." Stapley recalled he was furious with the director as he was cast as "the baddie, which was not the most important part. I had never played a baddie before, but he told me that I would enjoy it, it's always more fun to play the villain." Stapley described the film a having a moderate budget and a considerably longer shooting schedule, recalling that it lasted over six weeks.

In 1996, when journalist Robert Monell interviewed actor Richard Wyler that Bava had partially worked as the cinematographer on Il pistolero segnato da dio  Sandro Mancori is credited as the film's cinematographer and who worked with Bava anonymously on earlier productions.

Release
Il pistolero segnato da dio was released on February 29, 1968, where it was distributed to Augustus. The film was later re-issued in Italy as Due pistole e un vigliacco.

As of 2013, Il pistolero segnato da Dio was never released in the United States and no English-language version of the film is known to exist.

References

Sources

External links

 

Spaghetti Western films
1968 Western (genre) films
1968 films
Films directed by Giorgio Ferroni
Films scored by Carlo Rustichelli
1960s Italian-language films
1960s Italian films